"Clunk Click Every Trip" is the slogan of a series of British public information films, commencing in the summer of 1970 presented by Shaw Taylor, then in January 1971, starring Jimmy Savile.

The BBC adapted Savile's slogan for the title of his Saturday night variety show beginning in 1973. The slogan was introduced during the previous campaign, fronted by Shaw Taylor and featuring the slogan "Your seatbelt is their security". However, it was the onomatopoeia used by Taylor to describe the act of closing the door and fastening a seatbelt which proved the most memorable aspect of the campaign, and so it was upgraded to act as the slogan when the films moved into colour.

The advertisements highlighted the dangers of traffic collisions and reminded drivers that the first thing they should do after closing the door ("Clunk") is fasten their seatbelt ("Click"). These advertisements, which included graphic sequences of drivers being thrown through the windscreen and, in one Savile-hosted public service announcement, an image of a disfigured woman who survived such an accident helped lay the groundwork for compulsory seatbelt use in the front seat of a vehicle, which came into force on 31 January 1983 in the UK, although car manufacturers had been legally obliged to fit front seatbelts since 1965.

See also

 Seat belt legislation
 Click It or Ticket

References

External links
Clunk Click – Shopping with Jimmy Savile National Archives
The message clicks BBC News, 1 February 2006

Automotive safety
British advertising slogans
Public information films
Jimmy Savile
1971 in the United Kingdom
1971 neologisms
1993 disestablishments
Seat belts
1971 films
1970s educational films
British educational films